is a 2004 anime action fantasy film based on Masashi Kishimoto's manga and anime Naruto. It was released in Japan on August 21, 2004. The film is set after episode 101. In the United States, the film aired on Cartoon Network on September 8, 2007. The ending song Home Sweet Home is performed by Yuki Isoya. The English adaptation replaced the song with Jeremy Sweet's "Never Give Up", due to licensing restrictions. 

In the film, Naruto Uzumaki and his ninja team work on a bodyguard mission to protect Princess Yukie Fujikaze, who is posing as a film actress.

An original video animation, Konoha Annual Sports Festival (木ノ葉運動会 Konoha Undōkai), was included with the Japanese release of the film. The film grossed US$11.1 million in the box offices and received generally positive reviews from critics for its focus on animation and well-executed action sequences despite the character Yukie Fujikaze often being seen as the least interesting character presented.

Plot
Naruto Uzumaki, Sasuke Uchiha and Sakura Haruno watch a film starring Yukie Fujikaze, in a local cinema. Kakashi Hatake has summoned them to watch it as preparation for their next mission: to prevent Yukie, who plays Princess Gale in the films, from being captured during production of her latest film. Yukie is later revealed to be Koyuki Kazahana, a princess from an island known as the Land of Snow. Doto Kazahana, who is revealed to be Koyuki's uncle, was responsible for the murder of her father Sosetsu in a coup d'etat.

During the shooting of the film, Doto's henchmen, wearing chakra armor, attempt to capture the princess, but Team 7 manages to delay the princess from being captured. Doto eventually captures Koyuki and kills her bodyguards, who reveal themselves in an attempt to protect and restore her rightful place as the ruler of the Land of Snow. Naruto enters the ship to rescue the princess, only to be captured and forced to wear a chakra-draining device. Doto forces Koyuki to hand over a crystal necklace her father had given her when she was young, thinking that this is a key that can unlock the hidden treasure Sosetsu had left behind before detaining both Koyuki and Naruto. 

Sasuke, Sakura and Kakashi infiltrate the fortress while Naruto and Koyuki escape from captivity. They confront Doto but he manages to capture the crystal necklace and flees with Koyuki. Naruto proceeds to follow Doto while the remaining members of Team 7 confront Doto's henchmen. Kakashi gets his revenge by defeating Doto's henchman Nadare Roga, while Sasuke and Sakura defeat the other two henchmen Fubuki Kakuyoku and Mizore Fuyukuma. Meanwhile, Doto discovers the hidden treasure to transform the island into the Land of Spring using a heat generator. 

Naruto confronts him in a duel, but gets overpowered while Sasuke uses his  to weaken Doto's armour. Soon after, Naruto releases his energy and uses his  new Seven Colored Chakra Rasengan, killing Doto and activating a mirror to transform the land. In the aftermath, Koyuki decides to reclaim her rightful place of royalty and even mentions personally with Team 7 that even in the life of royalty, her acting career will not end. Soon after the adventure, Naruto receives an envelope by Sasuke and Sakura with a picture of him and Yukie signed by Yukie/Koyuki where they get ready to embark on a new adventure together as Team 7.

Cast

Release

The film was originally released in Japan on August 21, 2004. It was later released on DVD on April 28, 2005. The film was released in 160 theaters in the United States as a one-day showing on June 6, 2007 courtesy of Fathom Events. Fifty theaters in Canada would see a one-day showing on June 23, 2007. Madman Entertainment did a special one-day theater release in Australia on October 14, 2007. In 2007, the film was shown at the Fantasia Festival and in the British Museum. The film grossed $11,141,307 in the box offices.

The film uses most of the most voice actors from the original television series with Junko Takeuchi returning as the role of the protagonist, Naruto Uzumaki. In contrast to the tv series, Takeuchi found this incarnation of the character to be more challenging to portray. She noticed multiple scenes where she had to yell such as when Naruto runs away from a train while holding Yukie. However, she felt that Naruto continued standing out as a character despite his young age such as when often talks about his ideals of not giving up to achieve his missions which contrast to her early skeptical views on him. Kakashi Hatake's voice actor Kazuhiko Inoue noted that he often assisted Takeuchi during recording of the movie in a similar manner to his character whose primary role is to support his students. As a result of the film being first recorded in Japanese, the actors expressed pressure and honor in delivering such roles.

The DVD release debuted at rank 25 on Nielsen Videoscan.

Instead of the OVA included with the Japanese release, the American release included a short featurette entitled World of Naruto, as well as a behind the scenes featurette afterwards with interviews with the main English cast and select members of the main Japanese cast. The OVA will, however, appear in the North American DVD release. The DVD was released on September 4, 2007. The film premiered on Cartoon Network on September 8, 2007. The film also played at Cineplex Odeon and Empire Theatres cinemas in Canada, distributed via Bell Satellite TV to play the film at all cinemas at the same time.

On November 13, 2007, a three-disc Deluxe Edition of the film was released. It has many extras and features that the standard DVD, released a few months earlier, did not include. It includes the ten-minute short "Konoha Annual Sports Festival" that was originally shown with the Japanese release of the film, the complete soundtrack to the movie, documentaries of the American voice recording of the movie, movie art postcards, and more.

Reception 
Naruto the Movie: Ninja Clash in the Land of Snow received positive reviews from critics.

Helen McCarthy in 500 Essential Anime Movies calls it "a good introduction to the main themes of the series, with ideas of persistence, determination, believing in yourself, and never giving up", and praises setting and backgrounds, "with the frozen Northern landscapes looking especially good". Active Anime stated that "Naruto the Movie is a lavish production and thrilling story that surpasses expectations." citing the multiple atmosphere which is reliable to the source material as a result of employing both dramatic and comical events. It was also praised based on its accessibility, 

Something which Comic Book Bin agreed with. Comic Book Bin gave it a 7 out of 10, citing major violence that is not balanced by the audience the film is meant for and felt the lead Koyuki might not come across as a likable character based on the multiple twists given to her identity and mission. Nevertheless, Comic Book Bin praised the action scenes which were found likeable alongside Pierrot's animation. DVD Talk found the film enjoyable but lamented the main recurring herores of the feature were often pushed aside in favor of the new characters. Nevertheless, the series praised the focus between Naruto and Yukine's relationship due to how similar they are and become closer in the narrative.

Comic Book Resources listed the film as the third best Naruto movie based on the user's Rotten Tomatoes score. The site praised the portrayal of the main trio with focus on Sasuke Uchiha due to his lack of appearances in subsequent movies, the narrative in general as well as technology that provided a more unique type of setting. In another article, the site found the animation and fights appealing and recommended it to the long time fans.

References

Further reading

External links
 
 

2004 films
2004 anime films
2000s action adventure films
2004 fantasy films
2000s Japanese-language films
Japanese action films
Animated action films
Ninja Clash in the Land of Snow
Toho animated films
Viz Media anime